Crèvecoeur (also known as Heartbreak Ridge) is a 1955 French documentary film directed by Jacques Dupont. It was nominated for an Academy Award for Best Documentary Feature.  The plot revolves around French troops fighting under the United Nations Command in the Korean War.

References

External links

1954 films
1955 documentary films
1955 films
1950s French-language films
French documentary films
Films directed by Jacques Dupont
Korean War films
Documentary films about war
Military history of France
1950s French films